GOOSE is a Belgian electronic rock band consisting of members Mickael Karkousse, Dave Martijn, Tom Coghe, and Bert Libeert.

GOOSE was formed in the summer of 2000 in Kortrijk, Belgium. They started writing and recording their own songs, heavily incorporating synthesizers into them. They won Humo's Rock Rally in 2002 and later that year recorded their debut single "Audience" with Teo Miller. Coca-Cola used their debut single for TV adverts across Europe.

They were signed to Skint Records and their debut album "Bring It On" was released on September 11, 2006.

HISTORY 

Described by The Guardian as an ‘onstage powerhouse, successfully bridging the gap between electronic music and rock’, GOOSE has continued to make big waves – almost 2 decades after the release of its much-hyped debut album "Bring It On" (2006) on Skint Records. NME named them as Europe’s answer to New Rave and toured the world with acts like Justice, MSTRKRFT, Steve AOKI, YELLE, Digitalism, Cut Copy, Hot Chip, Klaxons, Soulwax in clubs and festivals from Rock Werchter to Summer Sonic.

Their second album "Synrise" (!K7) not only saw the band working with Peaches (on the highly addictive title track), they also enlisted legendary Pink Floyd designer Storm Thorgerson to create the artwork. "Synrise" became a live anthem over the years and got featured on several series, games and campaigns such as GTA V ( Soulwax remix ),  the Dior the Ready-to-Wear Fall collection 2013 and in episode 1 of season 6 of the Spanish Netflix series ELITE (2022).

For their third studio album called “CONTROL CONTROL CONTROL” GOOSE worked with producer Paul Stacey (who also produced Noel Gallagher and The Black Crowes) and Dave Sardy (Oasis, ZZ Top) resulting in an album with an exciting live sound. “We had come to realize that our live shows had become the backbone of GOOSE – proof of how we had continued to grow as a band. So we wanted to record an album that was a testament to that live sound – one that wouldn’t rely heavily on software and machinery.”

The fourth album "What You Need", mostly recorded in Los Angeles with Jason Falkner , was released on 15 April 2016 and entered the Belgian album charts on number 1. The album was accompanied by a short film directed by Willy Vanderperre. 2016 also became the year GOOSE performed on the main stage of Rock Werchter for the first time & selling out the Antwerp Lotto Arena.

In 2018 GOOSE  opted to embrace their freedom and take the independent route via their own Safari Records imprint. The label shares the same name as the band’s Safari studios in their hometown Kortrijk, a hub for free-wheeling experimentation, and a place for GOOSE to do what they do best.

"Endless" began as an avalanche of ideas in Safari Studios, before GOOSE opted to bring in French producer Victor le Masne who sat down with the band at their HQ, before inviting them to Motorbass Studios in Paris.

The decision to include an outside perspective could be what makes "Endless" such a powerful record. Each note is sharpened, each effect magnified, with Victor le Masne tasked with pushing GOOSE to the next level. “We needed someone to break us out of our comfort zone,” explains Mickael Karkousse. “It’s so great to be challenged. With somebody else in the room, you move past all these unwritten rules you’ve developed over time. We could just try stuff, and see if it worked.”

Breaking themselves open, GOOSE have responded with a record that taps back into their roots. Opening with the title track, "Endless" begins on the front foot – crunching rock guitars, clinical electronics, and a touch of club flair amid the emotive songwriting. “It’s a key track on the album,” comments Dave Martijn. “The guitars are returning. There’s a lot of emotion. A sexiness in it. A little bit of French Touch. It’s a good summary of the rest of the album.”

Collaborations:

As visionary fashion designer Raf Simons puts it: “GOOSE is new energy.” And fifteen years after bursting onto the scene with Bring It On, the band’s debut album on UK label Skint, the Belgian four-piece is far from running out. In fact, since opening their own playground Safari Studios in their hometown of Kortrijk, they’re recording new tracks, remixes, and collaborations at a faster pace than ever before. In 2010 they enlisted legendary Pink Floyd designer Storm Thorgerson to create the artwork of their sophomore album Synrise, invited Peaches to perform on the title track or with newfangled fashion photographers Willy Vanderperre ( Raf Simons, Dior, Prada, Calvin Klein ) and, Pierre Debusschere ( Beyonce, Dior ) to create a series of short films for both album Control Control Control (2012) and What You Need (2016) – In 2019 GOOSE found just the right artist to paint a picture of its new sonic exploits, Something New (2019). His name? Zeno X gallery artist Bart Stolle, known for bridging the gap between century-old traditions and the digital age. Because if there is one thing GOOSE knows a thing or two about, it’s bridging gaps – between rockers and ravers, pillheads and pissheads, minimalists and maximalists. The band has been bringing together polar worlds since 2006 and making it seem like they were always meant to be together – all the while rewriting its DNA on almost every single occasion. Like when they made a multimedia installation called De/ReConstruction (2014), during which they performed an entire set with each band member on a different floor of a massive building. Or when they teamed up with Audi, using the auto manufacturer’s showpiece R8 engine as a synthesizer at a live performance called Circles in 2017 and recently created a short film for their track Run Away taken from their 5th studio Album Endless (2022) in collaboration with Audi. And then, of course, there is GOOSE NON STOP, the band’s 2018 live set, in which they reimagine their past bangers, and which has led to arresting gigs at festivals like Tomorrowland and Pukkelpop. And hosting festival rooms like I LOVE TECHNO, Ghent featuring Gessafelstein, Annie Mac, The Bloody Beetroots, Digitalism, Miss Kittin.

DISCOGRAPHY

ALBUMS 
 Bring It On | Skint Records (11 September 2006)  
 Synrise | !K7 Records (18 October 2010)
 Control Control Control| | Safari Records/Universal Music (12 October 2012)
 What You Need | Safari Records/Universal Music (4 April 2016)
 Something New | Safari Records/Universal Music (26 february 2021) 
 Endless | Safari Records/Universal Music (11 March 2022)

SINGLES 
 "Audience" (2002)
 "Good Times" (2004)
 "Black Gloves", Skint Records (2006)
 "British Mode", Skint Records (2006)
 "Low Mode", Skint Records (2007)
 "Bring It On", Skint Records (2007)
 "Words", !K7 Records (2010)
 "Can't Stop Me Now", !K7 Records (2010)
 "Synrise", !K7 Records (2011)
 "Synrise", Music Mania Records (12" picture disc by Storm Thorgerson,  exclusive Soulwax remix)
 "Real" (2012)
 "Control" (2012)
 "Your Ways" (2013)
 "So Long" (2016)
 "What You Need" (2016)
 "Trip ft. SX" (2017) 
 "Circles" (2018) 
 "Something New" (2019)
 "Girls Who Act Like Boys" (2019) 
 "Heaven" (2020)
 "Viper" (2020) 
 "Losing You" (2020) 
 "Endless" (2022) 
 "Change" (2022) 
 "Fear Of Letting Go" (2022)  
 "Run Away" (2022) 
 "Rock" (2023) 
 "Get It Started" (2023)

REMIXES
BY GOOSE 

 SX - "Gold"
 Purple Haze - "You & Me"
 Scissor Sisters - "She's My Man"
 Shitdisco - "I Know Kung Fu"
 White Lies (band) - "There Goes Our Love Again"
 Mixhell - "Highly Explicit"
 Daft Punk - "Son Of Flynn"
 Martin Solveig - "C'est La Vie"
 Jamaica - "Short and Entertaining"
 Jessie Ware - "Night Light (Unofficial)"

FOR GOOSE 
 The Bloody Beetroots - "Black Gloves"
 The Bloody Beetroots - "Can't Stop Me Now" 
 The Bloody Beetroots - "Everybody"
 Soulwax - "Synrise"
 Maxim Lany - "Girls Who Act Like Boys" 
 Cellini - "Words"
 Jef Neve - "Synrise (piano version"
 John Noseda - "Something New". 
 Whitesquare - "Losing You"
 B-Sights - "What You Need" 
 Simon Le Saint - "Call Me" 
 Doganov - "What You Need" 
 Digitalism - "What You Need"  
 B1980 - "Girls Who Act Like Boys" 
 Theus Mago - "Viper"  
 Jester - "British Mode"

MUSIC IN FILMS & TV SHOWS 

TV SHOWS 
 "Check": CSI: NY, Season 3, Episode 1 ("People with Money")  (2006)
 "Trendsetter": Chuck, Season 1, Episode 7 ("Chuck vs. the Alama Mater") (2007)
 "Bring It On": Dirty Sexy Money
 "Audience": CSI: Miami, Season 6, Episode 10 ("CSI: My Nanny") (2008)
 "Synrise (Soulwax remix)": Used to advertise Season 2 of Utopia on Channel 4 in the UK (2014)
 "Synrise": Elite, Season 6, Episode 1 ("Anxiety") (2022) 
FILMS 

“Black Gloves”: Wild Child (2008)
 "Black Gloves": Whip It (Film) (2009)
 "Black Gloves": Trailer Blitz (2011) 
 "Synrise": Move On (2012)

MUSIC IN GAMES
 "Black Gloves": Project Gotham Racing 4 (2007)
 "Check": Gran Turismo 5 and "Words (Jester Dub) (GT5 Edit)": Gran Turismo 5 (2010)
 "Synrise (Soulwax Remix)": Grand Theft Auto V (2013) on the Soulwax FM radio station

SOCIAL MEDIA 

 Official website 
 Instagram 
 Facebook 
 Spotify 
 Apple Music 
 YouTube 

Belgian electronic rock musical groups
Dance-punk musical groups
Musical groups established in 2000
Belgian dance music groups